Hip Hop 4 Life (Formerly Hip Hip 4 Health) is a 501 c(3) not-for-profit organization educating young people to adopt a healthy lifestyle. Health professionals, entertainers, celebrities and athletes are enlisted to educate young people on health issues through interactive workshops and empowerment seminars. Hip Hop 4 Life serves young people aged 10–18, with a special emphasis on at risk and low income youth.

Notes 

Non-profit organizations based in New York City
Youth organizations based in New York City